Fuad Ramli (born 2 June 1994) is a Singaporean professional footballer who currently plays for Geylang International in the S.League. He plays as a midfielder.

Fuad is also the brother of professional footballer Faris Ramli, who plays for Hougang United in the Singapore Premier League.

Career
Fuad Ramli played for Geylang International in the Prime League squad in the early stages of 2013. Subsequently, he was called up to represent the senior team. He scored a goal for the club in the 4–0 victory over Warriors.

References

1994 births
Living people
Singaporean footballers
Association football midfielders
Geylang International FC players